Al-Masajid is a form of the Arabic word for mosque, and may refer to two places in Yemen:
Al-Masajid, Sana'a, Yemen
Al-Masajid (archaeological site), Ma'rib, Yemen